The distributional learning theory or learning of probability distribution is a framework in computational learning theory. It has been proposed from Michael Kearns, Yishay Mansour, Dana Ron, Ronitt Rubinfeld, Robert Schapire and Linda Sellie in 1994  and it was inspired from the PAC-framework introduced by Leslie Valiant.

In this framework the input is a number of samples drawn from a distribution that belongs to a specific class of distributions. The goal is to find an efficient algorithm that, based on these samples, determines with high probability the distribution from which the samples have been drawn. Because of its generality, this framework has been used in a large variety of different fields like machine learning, approximation algorithms, applied probability and statistics.

This article explains the basic definitions, tools and results in this framework from the theory of computation point of view.

Definitions

Let  be the support of the distributions of interest. As in the original work of Kearns et al. if  is finite it can be assumed without loss of generality that  where  is the number of bits that have to be used in order to represent any .

 generator a generator  for  takes as input a string of truly random bits  and outputs  according to the distribution . Generator can be interpreted as a routine that simulates sampling from the distribution  given a sequence of fair coin tosses.

A distribution  is called to have a polynomial generator (respectively evaluator) if its generator (respectively evaluator) exists and can be computed in polynomial time.

Before defining learnability, it is necessary to define good approximations of a distribution . There are several ways to measure the distance between two distribution. The three more common possibilities are

 Kullback-Leibler divergence
 Total variation distance of probability measures
 Kolmogorov distance

The strongest of these distances is the Kullback-Leibler divergence and the weakest is the Kolmogorov distance. This means that for any pair of distributions ,  :

to all the other distances.

Next definitions hold for all the distances and therefore the symbol  denotes the distance between the distribution  and the distribution  using one of the distances that we describe above. Although learnability of a class of distributions can be defined using any of these distances, applications refer to a specific distance.

The basic input that we use in order to learn a distribution is a number of samples drawn by this distribution. For the computational point of view the assumption is that such a sample is given in a constant amount of time. So it's like having access to an oracle  that returns a sample from the distribution . Sometimes the interest is, apart from measuring the time complexity, to measure the number of samples that have to be used in order to learn a specific distribution  in class of distributions . This quantity is called sample complexity of the learning algorithm.

In order for the problem of distribution learning to be more clear consider the problem of supervised learning as defined in. In this framework of statistical learning theory a training set  and the goal is to find a target function  that minimizes some loss function, e.g. the square loss function. More formally , where  is the loss function, e.g.  and  the probability distribution according to which the elements of the training set are sampled. If the conditional probability distribution  is known then the target function has the closed form . So the set  is a set of samples from the probability distribution . Now the goal of distributional learning theory if to find  given  which can be used to find the target function .

Definition of learnability

If we know that  then  is called proper learning algorithm, otherwise is called improper learning algorithm.

In some settings the class of distributions  is a class with well known distributions which can be described by a set of parameters. For instance  could be the class of all the Gaussian distributions . In this case the algorithm  should be able to estimate the parameters . In this case  is called parameter learning algorithm.

Obviously the parameter learning for simple distributions is a very well studied field that is called statistical estimation and there is a very long bibliography on different estimators for different kinds of simple known distributions. But distributions learning theory deals with learning class of distributions that have more complicated description.

First results

In their seminal work, Kearns et al. deal with the case where  is described in term of a finite polynomial sized circuit and they proved the following for some specific classes of distribution.

  gate distributions for this kind of distributions there is no polynomial-sized evaluator, unless . On the other hand, this class is efficiently learnable with generator.
 Parity gate distributions this class is efficiently learnable with both generator and evaluator.
 Mixtures of Hamming Balls this class is efficiently learnable with both generator and evaluator.
 Probabilistic Finite Automata this class is not efficiently learnable with evaluator under the Noisy Parity Assumption which is an impossibility assumption in the PAC learning framework.

Covers

Definition

A set  is called -cover of  if for every  there is a  such that . An  cover is small if it has polynomial size with respect to the parameters that describe .

Once there is an efficient procedure that for every  finds a small cover  of C then the only left task is to select from  the distribution  that is closer to the distribution  that has to be learned.

Therefore, the samples from  have to be used to do these comparisons. Obviously the result of the comparison always has a probability of error. So the task is similar with finding the minimum in a set of element using noisy comparisons. There are a lot of classical algorithms in order to achieve this goal.

Learning sums of random variables

Learning of simple well known distributions is a well studied field and there are a lot of estimators that can be used. One more complicated class of distributions is the distribution of a sum of variables that follow simple distributions. These learning procedure have a close relation with limit theorems like the central limit theorem because they tend to examine the same object when the sum tends to an infinite sum. Recently there are two results that described here include the learning Poisson binomial distributions and learning sums of independent integer random variables. All the results below hold using the total variation distance as a distance measure.

Learning Poisson binomial distributions

Consider  independent Bernoulli random variables  with probabilities of success . A Poisson Binomial Distribution of order  is the distribution of the sum . For learning the class .

Theorem

Theorem

The proof uses a small cover of  that has been produced by Daskalakis and Papadimitriou, in order to get this algorithm.

Learning Sums of Independent Integer Random Variables

Consider  independent random variables  each of which follows an arbitrary distribution with support . A sum of independent integer random variable of order  is the distribution of the sum . For learning the class

there is the following result

Theorem

Let  then there is an algorithm which given ,  and access to  finds a  such that .

Its possible to conclude this independence for the previous section if we set .

Learning mixtures of Gaussians

In this case  is said to follow a mixture of Gaussians. Pearson  was the first who introduced the notion of the mixtures of Gaussians in his attempt to explain the probability distribution from which he got same data that he wanted to analyze. So after doing a lot of calculations by hand, he finally fitted his data to a mixture of Gaussians. The learning task in this case is to determine the parameters of the mixture .

The first attempt to solve this problem was from Dasgupta. In this work Dasgupta assumes that the two means of the Gaussians are far enough from each other. This means that there is a lower bound on the distance . Using this assumption Dasgupta and a lot of scientists after him were able to learn the parameters of the mixture. The learning procedure starts with clustering the samples into two different clusters minimizing some metric. Using the assumption that the means of the Gaussians are far away from each other with high probability the samples in the first cluster correspond to samples from the first Gaussian and the samples in the second cluster to samples from the second one.

If  is the set of all the mixtures of two Gaussians, using the above procedure theorems like the following can be proved.

Theorem 

The above result could also be generalized in mixture of Gaussians.

For the case of mixture of two Gaussians there are learning results without the assumption of the distance between their means, like the following one which uses the total variation distance as a distance measure.

Theorem 

Let  then there is an algorithm which given ,  and access to  finds  such that if , where  then .

References

Computational learning theory